Luis Alberto Flores (born April 11, 1981) is a Dominican former professional basketball player. He is a 6 ft 2 in (1.88 m) tall point guard-shooting guard. He grew up in the United States, in the predominantly Dominican neighborhood of Washington Heights, in New York City, and attended Norman Thomas High School. Flores is a member of the senior Dominican Republic national basketball team. He was the  2009 top scorer in the Israel Basketball Premier League.

High school
Flores attended Norman Thomas High School, in New York City, where he played high school basketball.

College career
Flores played his freshman college basketball season with Rutgers University, but he really showed all his potential during his three years with Manhattan College. He finished his career as Manhattan's all-time leading scorer, averaging 22.7 points per game. He was named All-Metro Atlantic Athletic Conference Player of the Year and Tournament Most Valuable Player, both in his junior and senior season. He also was selected to the All-Metro Atlantic Athletic Conference First Team, during his three seasons in Manhattan, and was the 2003 and 2004 recipient of the Haggerty Award, being named the top player in the NYC area - only the eighth player to win the award multiple times, in the 70+ year history of the honor.

Professional career
Flores was drafted by the Houston Rockets, in the 2nd round (55th pick) of the 2004 NBA draft. His draft rights were traded to the Dallas Mavericks, along with $300,000 cash, in exchange for the draft rights to Vassilis Spanoulis, before being traded to the Golden State Warriors, on August 24, 2004. He played in 15 games with the Warriors (4.9 min per game), before being traded to the Denver Nuggets, on February 24, 2005. He appeared only in one game with the Nuggets, playing 4 minutes, and was waived on August 30. Flores played three preseason games for the New Orleans Hornets in 2006. After not making the Hornets regular season roster, Flores left for Europe.

Overseas, Flores first played in Italy, for BT Roseto (November 2005–2006), and Bipop Carire Reggio Emilia (December 2006–2007). On August 8, 2007, he signed with Greek League team Olympias Patras. In January, 2008, Flores returned to Italy, where he signed with Italian 2nd Division team Indesit Fabriano. 

2008–2009 saw Flores in Israel, playing impressively for Ligat HaAl's defending champion, Hapoel Holon. Flores helped Holon to their first Israeli State Cup title. He was the  2009 top scorer in the Israel Basketball Premier League. He left the team in the summer of 2009, to sign in Russia, for Krasnye Krylya Samara.

In 2011, he signed with Asefa Estudiantes in Spain; he later left for the birth of his child. Then he signed with Budivelnyk Kyiv of Ukraine. After ending the season, Flores joined the Titanes del Licey of the Dominican Republic, where he made the playoffs, before being eliminated in the 1st round.

National team career
As a member of the senior Dominican Republic national basketball team, Flores played at the following tournaments: the 2003 Centrobasket, where he won a silver medal, the 2003 Pan American Games, where he won a silver medal, the 2005 FIBA Americas Championship, the 2009 FIBA Americas Championship, the 2011 FIBA Americas Championship, where he won a bronze medal, and the 2015 FIBA Americas Championship.

References

External links
ESPN.com profile
FIBA Archive profile
LatinBasket.com profile
NBA.com profile

1981 births
Living people
Basketball players at the 2003 Pan American Games
BC Budivelnyk players
BC Donetsk players
BC Krasnye Krylia players
BC Nokia players
Capitanes de Ciudad de México players
CB Estudiantes players
Denver Nuggets players
Dominican Republic expatriate basketball people in Finland
Dominican Republic expatriate basketball people in Greece
Dominican Republic expatriate basketball people in Israel
Dominican Republic expatriate basketball people in Italy
Dominican Republic expatriate basketball people in Mexico
Dominican Republic expatriate basketball people in Russia
Dominican Republic expatriate basketball people in Spain
Dominican Republic expatriate basketball people in Ukraine
Dominican Republic expatriate basketball people in the United States
Dominican Republic expatriate basketball people in Venezuela
Fabriano Basket players
Golden State Warriors players
Greek Basket League players
Guaiqueríes de Margarita players
Guaros de Lara (basketball) players
Hapoel Eilat basketball players
Hapoel Holon players
Houston Rockets draft picks
Israeli Basketball Premier League players
Liga ACB players
Manhattan Jaspers basketball players
Marinos B.B.C. players
National Basketball Association players from the Dominican Republic
Olympias Patras B.C. players
Ostioneros de Guaymas (basketball) players
Pallacanestro Reggiana players
Pan American Games medalists in basketball
Pan American Games silver medalists for the Dominican Republic
Point guards
Roseto Sharks players
Rutgers Scarlet Knights men's basketball players
Shooting guards
Sportspeople from Manhattan
Basketball players from New York City
Sportspeople from San Pedro de Macorís
Venados de Mazatlán (basketball) players
Medalists at the 2003 Pan American Games